Sarah Wachter (born 16 December 1999) is a German handball player for Neckarsulmer SU and the German national team.

She was selected as part of the German 35-player squad for the 2020 European Women's Handball Championship.

References

1999 births
Living people
German female handball players